The Carpinteria Tar Pits (also Carpinteria Oil Seeps) are a series of natural asphalt lakes situated in the southern part of Santa Barbara County in southern California, USA.

The Carpinteria Tar Pits are a natural asphalt lake areas similar to Tierra de Brea Trinidad and Tobago, Lake Guanoco in Venezuela and the La Brea Tar Pits (Los Angeles) and McKittrick Tar Pits (McKittrick) both also located in the US state of California.

Geography

The area is a designated park, the Tar Pits Park, and lies within the Carpinteria State Beach area in the southern part between the Santa Rosa and the San Miguel campsites. Most of the tar pits are located along a short stretch directly on the beach and generate from the underlying Carpinteria Offshore Oil Field.

Geology
The Carpinteria Tar Pits probably date from the Pleistocene epoch.

The creation of an asphalt lake is typically the result of upwards migrations of hydrocarbons along a geologic fault.  Additionally, in connection with subduction pressure can be created against underlying oil source rock.

The oil moves towards the surface and slowly transforms into bitumen; on the way through the lithosphere, it picks up clay and water and is cooled into asphalt.

History
The Carpinteria Tar Pits were known to the Chumash people, who mined the asphalt and used it as a sealant for waterproofing their tomols (plank-built boats) and other purposes.

The area was named "La Carpinteria" (the carpentry) by a Spanish expedition under explorer Gaspar de Portolá, which arrived in the area on August 17, 1769. Starting around 1915, the tar pits were mined and the asphalt was used for building a coastal highway. In 1933, the area was designated a state beach and in 1941 it was formally opened to the public.

The tar pits have trapped and preserved hundreds of Pleistocene Age birds and animals. Some findings are on display at the Carpinteria Valley Museum of History, but no paleontological studies have been conducted because the tar pits were used as a local rubbish dump.

See also
Petroleum seep
Asphalt volcano
Coal Oil Point seep field

References

Asphalt lakes
Carpinteria, California
Parks in Santa Barbara County, California
Pleistocene paleontological sites of North America
Lagerstätten
Natural history of California
Paleontology in California
Oil fields in Santa Barbara County, California